Knoutsodonta pictoni is a species of sea slug, a dorid nudibranch, a shell-less marine gastropod mollusc in the family Onchidorididae.

Distribution
The type locality of this species is Tavolara-Punta Coda Cavallo Marine Protected Area, Porto San Paolo, North Eastern Sardinia, Central Tyrrhenian
Sea, Mediterranean Sea, Italy, . The original description included specimens from Achill Island, Ireland, Atlantic Ocean and Trieste, North Adriatic Sea, Italy. It is also known from the west coast of Scotland and Spain.

Diet
Knoutsodonta pictoni feeds on the bryozoan Reptadeonella violacea

References

Onchidorididae
Gastropods described in 2017